Lalo = Brilliance (subtitled The Piano of Lalo Schifrin) is an album by Argentine composer, pianist and conductor Lalo Schifrin recorded in 1962 and released on the Roulette label. The album was one of Schifrin's earliest solo albums and features musicians from Dizzy Gillespie's band.

Track listing
All compositions by Lalo Schifrin except as indicated
 "The Snake's Dance" - 3:27   
 "An Evening in Sao Paulo" - 2:44   
 "Desafinado" (Antonio Carlos Jobim) - 3:17   
 "Kush" (Dizzy Gillespie) - 6:13   
 "Rhythm-A-Ning" (Thelonious Monk) - 4:32   
 "Mount Olive" -  4:38   
 "Cubano Be" (George Russell) - 3:10   
 "Sphayros"  4:00  
Recorded in New York City in 1962

Personnel
Lalo Schifrin - piano, arranger
Leo Wright - alto saxophone, flute
Jimmy Raney - guitar
Art Davis - bass
Rudy Collins - drums
Willie Rodriguez - conga, bongos

References

Lalo Schifrin albums
1962 albums
Albums produced by Teddy Reig
Albums arranged by Lalo Schifrin
Roulette Records albums